East Road may refer to:

 East Road, Cambridge, England
 East Road, London, England
 East Road, a road mentioned in J. R. R. Tolkien's stories of Middle-earth